This is a list of castles in Belarus.

B 
 Belaya Vezha, a common misnomer for the Tower of Kamyenyets
Babruysk fortress 
Brest Fortress, also known as Brest-Litovsk fortress

H 
Hajciunishki 
Halshany Castle
Hieraniony Castle
Hrodna Old Castle
Hrodna New Castle

K 
Tower of Kamyanyets
Kletsk Castle
Kobryn castles
Kopys
Kosava castle
Kreva Castle

L 
Liahavichy 
Lida Castle
Lubcha Castle

M 
Mir Castle Complex
Muravanka Church

N 
Navahrudak Castle 
Niasvizh Castle

P 
Pischalauski

R 
Ruzhany Palace

S 
Smalyany Castle 
Slutsk Castle
Shklow Castle
Synkavichy Church
Svislach Castle

Z 
Zaslawye 

 
Castles
Belarus
Belarus
Castles